Julia Dalavia (born 9 February 1998) is a Brazilian actress.

Career 
Dalavia was born in Tijuca, Rio de Janeiro on February 9, 1998, daughter of Márcia Dalavia. She studied at O Tablado and took Video and Film courses with Cybele Santa Cruz, and Theatre at Humaita Culture House, with Daniela Pessoa and supervision of Pedro Vasconcelos.

She debuted in the theater in 2006, in the play A Fuga das Galinhas. In the same year, made her first film, O Cavaleiro Didi e a Princesa Lili, of Marcus Figueiredo. On television, she made her first role in Xuxa e as Noviças of Rede Globo in 2008. In 2012, debuted in national cinemas interpreting Stephane, the Tété in Até que a Sorte nos Separe. However, she became known in 2014 when interpreting Helena, character in the first phase of the novel Em Família of Manoel Carlos. In 2014, she participated in the cast of the soap opera Boogie Oogie.

Filmography

Television

Film

References 

1998 births
Living people
People from Rio de Janeiro (city)
Brazilian television actresses
Brazilian film actresses
21st-century Brazilian actresses